Pick may refer to:

Places
 Pick City, North Dakota, a town in the United States
 Pick Lake (Cochrane District, Ontario), a lake in Canada
 Pick Lake (Thunder Bay District), a lake in Canada
 Pick Mere, a lake in Pickmere, England

People with the name
 Pick (surname), a list of people with this name
 nickname of Percy Charles Pickard (1915–1944), British Royal Air Force pilot
 Pick Temple (1911–1991), American folk singer and children's television star
 Pick Withers (born 1948), drummer for the English rock band Dire Straits

Arts, entertainment, and media
 Plectrum or pick, a device for strumming a stringed instrument
Guitar pick, specific to guitars and similar instruments
 The Picks, a vocal quartet which backed Buddy Holly and the Crickets in 1957
 Pick (TV channel), a British television channel
 "The Pick", an episode of the television show Seinfeld
 Odds and evens or pick, a hand game
 Pick (film), short drama film, directed by Alicia K. Harris

Science and math
 Pick operating system, a computer operating system
 Pick's disease, a neurodegenerative disease
 Pick's theorem in geometry
 Sertoli cell nodule, also known as Pick's adenoma, a medical disorder

Sports
Pick, slang term for an interception
 Draft (sports) pick, the right to choose a player, or the player chosen
 Screen (sports), also called a pick, a blocking move used against a defender

Tools and weapons
Afro pick, a type of comb for kinky, coiled hair
Horseman's pick, a weapon used by medieval cavalry units in Europe
Ice pick
Lockpick (disambiguation), a tool used for lock picking
Pickaxe, a hand tool
Toothpick

Other uses
 Pick (hieroglyph), an ancient Egyptian symbol representing the tool
 Party of Independent Candidates of Kenya (or PICK), a political party in Kenya
 Pick stitch, in sewing
 Pick Szeged, a Hungarian meat company

See also

 
 
 Pique (disambiguation)